BN Biscuits (or Biscuiterie Nantaise) is a biscuit brand originally hailing from France, consisting of 2 golden-baked biscuits sandwiched together with a filling, originally chocolate-flavoured. It was launched in 1932, acquired by United Biscuits in 1998, and relaunched in September 2000.

Biscuiterie Nantaise company was acquired by General Mills in 1973, which later sold its European assets to PepsiCo in 1992. PepsiCo later sold BN to United Biscuits in exchange for several United Biscuits snack assets (including The Smith's Snackfood Company but excluding KP Snacks).

The BN range now consists of multiple different biscuit formats, but the classic sandwich biscuit range consists of two different shapes: circles and rounded squares. One side of the biscuit is decorated with one of four different faces. There are seven different flavours of the BN biscuit: chocolate, strawberry, vanilla, hazelnut, raspberry, apricot and milk chocolate. They also come in a "Mini BN" variety.

A relaunch in September 1999 in the United Kingdom involved an advertising campaign with the name "BN BN" sung along to the tune of an arranged version "Mah Nà Mah Nà". Despite public petitions, BN Biscuits were not sold in the UK for a 10-year gap (2003 to 2013); however, they were still sold in many French, Nigerian and Afghan stores.

In 2013, BN returned to UK supermarkets with new packaging and logos, branded as "McVitie's BN". A new advert for the biscuit, part of McVitie's then-current "Sweeet" campaign, once again featured an arranged version of "Mah Nà Mah Nà" in reference to the previous campaign, albeit with the correct lyrics rather than "BN BN".

In January 2022 BN were made available throughout the UK, re-launched under the McVitie's brand again with the slogan 'Taste the Smile'.  McVitie's returning range includes BN Chocolate, BN Vanilla, Mini BN Chocolate and Mini BN Strawberry.

References 

United Biscuits brands
Brand name snack foods